Amara Bangoura is a Guinean diplomat and the current Ambassador of Guinea to Russia, presenting his credentials to Russian President Vladimir Putin on 12 March 2001.

References

Living people
Ambassadors of Guinea to Russia
Ambassadors of Guinea to Ukraine
Year of birth missing (living people)